The Trouble with Angels is a 1966 American comedy film about the adventures of two girls in an all-girls Catholic school run by nuns. The film was directed by Ida Lupino and stars Hayley Mills (her first post-Disney film role), Rosalind Russell, and June Harding.

The film's cast includes Marge Redmond (who would play a nun in the television series The Flying Nun, which premiered the following year) as math teacher Sister Liguori, Mary Wickes (who reprised her role in the sequel Where Angels Go, Trouble Follows and later played a nun in the film Sister Act and sequel Sister Act 2: Back in the Habit) as gym teacher Sister Clarissa, and Portia Nelson (who played a nun in The Sound of Music the previous year) as art teacher Sister Elizabeth. Burlesque performer Gypsy Rose Lee appears in a small role. An uncredited Jim Hutton appears briefly as the principal of a competing school.

A sequel, Where Angels Go, Trouble Follows, starring Stella Stevens, was released in 1968, with Russell, Barnes, Mary Wickes and Dolores Sutton all reprising their roles as nuns.

Plot
The movie is set at St. Francis Academy, a fictional all-girls Catholic boarding school in Pennsylvania operated by an order of nuns. The Mother Superior is at odds with Mary Clancy, a rebellious teenager, and her friend Rachel Devery. The episodic story line follows the young women through their sophomore, junior and senior high-school years as they pull pranks on the sisters and repeatedly get into trouble. Both girls almost get expelled for smoking in the basement. Although Mary often resents the Mother Superior's authority and puzzles over why any woman would choose a nun's life, as time passes, she is touched by the sisters' dedication, devotion, kindness, love, and generosity; she slowly sees that their lives are of fulfillment, not deprivation. Mary experiences "the call" senior year and, after graduation, remains at the school to begin her novitiate in the order. Rachel is initially upset, then fully supports her friend's decision.

Cast

The Nuns:
 Rosalind Russell as the Mother Superior
 Binnie Barnes as Sister Celestine
 Camilla Sparv as Sister Constance
 Mary Wickes as Sister Clarissa
 Marge Redmond as Sister Liguori
 Dolores Sutton as Sister Rose Marie
 Margalo Gillmore as Sister Barbara
 Portia Nelson as Sister Elizabeth
 Marjorie Eaton as Sister Ursula
 Barbara Bell Wright as Sister Margaret
 Judith Lowry as Sister Prudence

The Girls:
 Hayley Mills as Mary Clancy
 June Harding as Rachel Devery
 Barbara Hunter as Marvel-Ann
 Bernadette Withers as Valerie
 Vicky Albright as Charlotte
 Patty Gerrity as Sheila 
 Vicki Draves as Kate
 Wendy Winkelman as Sandy
 Jewel Jaffe as Ginnie-Lou
 Gail Liddle as Priscilla
 Michael-Marie as Ruth
 Betty Jane Royale as Gladys
 Ronne Troup as Helen
 Catherine Wyles as Brigette

The Outsiders:
 Gypsy Rose Lee as Mrs. Mabel Dowling Phipps
 Jim Boles as Mr. Gottschalk
 Kent Smith as Uncle George
 Pat McCaffrie as Mr. Devery
 Harry Harvey, Sr. as Mr. Grisson 
 Mary Young as Mrs. Eldridge
 Jim Hutton as Mr. Petrie (uncredited)

Life with Mother Superior
The Trouble with Angels was based on the 1962 book Life with Mother Superior by Jane Trahey, about her own high school years at a Catholic school near Chicago, Illinois, in the 1930s. While in the memoir the school was portrayed as a boarding school outside the city, Trahey attended what is now Providence-St. Mel's High School, which was a day school. Many of the incidents mentioned in the book were based on Trahey's experiences at Mundelein College in Chicago. The character of Mary Clancy (Mills) was based on Jane's friend, Mary, who later became Sister John Eudes, a Sinsinawa Dominican nun (1922–2017).

The Washington Post called it "wonderful fun". The book became a best seller.

Production

Development
In June 1962, the film rights were purchased by Ken Donnellon and Jacqueline Babbin who knew Trahey in advertising. Donnellon said he wanted the film to be seen through the eyes of one of the young nuns.

They were unable to make the film. In August 1963 Ross Hunter was pursuing the novel; he wanted Loretta Young, Jane Wyman, Barbara Stanwyck and Virginia Grey to play nuns and Patty Duke and Mary Badham to play students.

In September 1964, the film rights were acquired by Columbia Pictures. The film was assigned to producer William Frye who had a multi-picture deal with the studio. Greta Garbo, Frye's original choice for the role of the Mother Superior, rejected the producer's offer of $1 million to star in the film. In November 1964, Frye approached Hayley Mills to appear and she eventually signed on the following May. The role of the Mother Superior went to Rosalind Russell, who said: "I have been around nuns my whole life and I wanted to do justice with them".

Frye hired Ida Lupino to direct; at the time Lupino was mostly working on action and suspense programs for television. This was the first time she had ever directed a large female cast. Lupino said "It's a change of pace".

Filming
Filming began in August 1965 under the title Mother Superior. The title was changed to The Trouble with Angels the following month out of fear there were too many other "nun" movies at the time (e.g. The Singing Nun).

"We are shooting it in color but the prevailing colors will be stark black and white and charcoal grey. Then there will be sudden slashes of bright color – a turquoise swimming pool, a green meadow. The possibilities of color are fantastic. And the picture will be warm and funny. And it's such a nice change – no blood spilled at all, darling", said Lupino.

The St. Francis Academy in the film was filmed on location at what was formerly known as St. Mary's Home for Children and is presently known as Lindenwold Castle in Ambler, Pennsylvania.

All interior shots were filmed at Columbia Studios at Sunset & Gower in Hollywood. Most exterior shots were filmed at the Greystone Mansion, which at the time was being leased by the City of Beverly Hills to the American Film Institute. The exterior track-side train/depot scenes (at the opening and closing of the movie) were shot at the former Atchison, Topeka and Santa Fe Railway depot in Monrovia, California featuring ALCO PA's. The station is now a stop on the Los Angeles Metro Gold Line. However, the opening establishing shot of the train station was filmed at the Merion Train Station in Merion, Pennsylvania. The film was budgeted at $2 million.

Camilla Sparv made her debut as a nun.

Before shooting began, Rosalind Russell was asked by an old school friend, now a mother superior in St. Louis, to attend a fundraiser for a Catholic girls' school she was starting. Russell proposed that her upcoming film would be "the ideal fundraiser" and convinced Columbia to hold the premiere in St. Louis. The world premiere and a reception were held at St. Louis's Fox Theatre with ticket proceeds going to the school's building fund.

At the time of filming, Mills was 19 years old, while Harding was 28. Both characters would have aged from 14 to 17 during the three years covered in the plot.

In October 1965 Jerry Goldsmith signed to do the music.

Reception
The film marked a departure for Mills, who was attempting to emerge from her juvenile leads in Walt Disney-produced teen comedies as a comedic actress.

Critical
The Trouble with Angels enjoyed good reviews, although Variety was critical: "An appealing story idea—hip Mother Superior nun who outfoxes and matures two rebellious students in a Catholic girls' school—has lost impact via repetitious plotting and pacing, plus routine direction....Graduation finds Mills in character switcheroo to which Catholic audiences will long since be alerted".

Box office
The film earned enough box-office success to warrant a sequel (Where Angels Go, Trouble Follows). Russell said: "I think it proves there's a place for the family picture, the sort of picture you can take the kiddies to and which isn't pure corn".  Filmink pointed out it proved "once again that Hayley Mills was box-office outside Disney."  However she opted not to reprise her role as the progressive protagonist in the sequel and was replaced by Stella Stevens, who played Sister George, a new foil to Rosalind Russell's Mother Superior.

See also
List of American films of 1966

References

External links
 
 
 
 

1966 films
1966 comedy films
American coming-of-age comedy films
Films set in boarding schools
Columbia Pictures films
Films scored by Jerry Goldsmith
Films about Catholic nuns
Films about educators
Films about religion
Films about Catholicism
Films about Christianity
Films directed by Ida Lupino
Nuns in fiction
1960s female buddy films
1960s English-language films
1960s American films
1960s coming-of-age comedy films